John Schumann and the Vagabond Crew are an Australian folk group formed in Adelaide in 2005. The band's name is taken from a line in Henry Lawson's poem "Knocking Around". Since it was founded a number of Australian musicians have been involved. The formation of the group marked the return of John Schumann, former Redgum frontman to regular performances and recording.

Recordings
As of 2013, the band has released two albums. Both have consisted of either cover songs or poems set to music. The first, Lawson, was a collection of Henry Lawson poems put to music. This marked the first collaboration between John Schumann, Hugh McDonald, and Michael Atkinson since Schumann left Redgum back in 1986.

Their second album was Behind the Lines, an album based largely around the theme of Australians at war. It also featured Hugh McDonald, although Michael Atkinson did not participate.

Other activities
The band provided the music for "Lawson", a one-man stage show by Max Cullen based on the life of Henry Lawson. They played in Vietnam to mark the 40th anniversary of the Battle of Long Tan, the most famous engagement involving Australians during the Vietnam War.

The group has played many concerts and festivals, especially around Anzac Day.

They have also played overseas for Australian forces several times. In December 2009 they visited East Timor to play for Australian and New Zealand troops stationed there, in September–October 2011 they played for Australian troops in Afghanistan and in July 2013 they played for Australian troops and Australian Federal Police in the Solomon Islands.

Discography

Studio albums
Lawson (2005)
Behind the Lines (August, 2008)

References

External links
Hugh McDonald's web site
John Schumann's official site
The official site for the "Lawson" album
The band's Facebook page

Australian folk music groups
Musical groups established in 2005